Justin Lee Hamilton (born September 17, 1982) is an American football coach and former player who is the defensive quality control coach for the Tennessee Titans of the National Football League (NFL). He was drafted by the Cleveland Browns in the seventh round of the 2006 NFL Draft.  He played college football at Virginia Tech and also served as their defensive coordinator in 2020 and 2021.

Early years
Hamilton played high school football at Clintwood High School in Clintwood, Virginia as a tailback.

College career
During his college career, Hamilton played wide receiver, tailback, and free safety for the Virginia Tech Hokies.

Professional career

Cleveland Browns
Hamilton was drafted in the seventh round of the 2006 NFL draft by the Cleveland Browns and signed a four-year contract July 2006.  During his rookie season, he appeared in ten games and recorded 15 tackles.

Prior to the 2007 season, Hamilton was waived with an injury settlement and spent the year out of football.

Washington Redskins
On May 30, 2008, Hamilton was signed by the Washington Redskins.  He was released by the Redskins on June 12, but re-signed on August 7 when fullback Pete Schmitt was waived.  Hamilton had a good preseason with a total of 11 tackles, one sack, and one forced fumble.  He survived the final cut on August 30 and made the 53-man roster.  On October 14, 2008, Hamilton was cut by the Washington Redskins.

Coaching career

University of Virginia's College at Wise
Hamilton served as assistant coach and defensive coordinator at UVa-Wise. He began as the conditioning coach and 2011 was his first year as defensive coordinator for the Highland Cavaliers football team.

Virginia Military Institute
Hamilton was hired in 2014 to coach outside linebackers for the Keydets. In January 2015, new VMI head coach Scott Wachenheim announced he was retaining Hamilton on the coaching staff.

Virginia Tech
Hamilton joined Virginia Tech's staff as the Director of Player Personnel- Defense in 2018, and was promoted to safeties coach prior to the 2019 season. Following the retirement of defensive coordinator Bud Foster, Hamilton was promoted to that position Dec. 8, 2019.

Tennessee Titans
On February 7, 2023, Hamilton was hired as a defensive quality control coach for the Tennessee Titans.

References

External links
Virginia Tech Hokies bio
Washington Redskins bio

1982 births
Living people
People from Norton, Virginia
American football cornerbacks
American football safeties
Virginia Tech Hokies football players
Cleveland Browns players
Washington Redskins players
Tennessee Titans coaches
Players of American football from Virginia